Mokhtarabad-e Bon Rud (also Romanized as Mokhtārābād-e Bon Rūd; also known as Mokhtārābād) is a village in Dasht-e Arzhan Rural District, Arzhan District, Shiraz County, Fars Province, Iran. At the 2006 census, its population was 136, in 32 families.

References 

Populated places in Shiraz County